Franklin Jewel Hickey (March 10, 1915 – December 8, 1993) was an American professional wrestler.

Professional wrestling career 
Hickey began working in New York City for the World Wide Wrestling Federation in 1964. He wrestled against Bruno Sammartino, Bobo Brazil, Bill Watts, Pedro Morales, Arnold Skaaland, and Gorilla Monsoon. In 1974 he retired from wrestling.

In 1993, he wrestled in two matches for the United States Wrestling Association taking place in Memphis on May 10 and May 15. In both matches, he teamed up with Brian Christopher, but lost to Koko B. Ware and Frank Morrell.

Death 
On December 8, 1993, Hickey died in Albany, Kentucky. He was 78 years old.

Championships and accomplishments
 Jack Pfefer Promotions
 World Heavyweight Championship (Jack Pfefer version) (1 time)

References

External links 
 

1915 births
1993 deaths
American male professional wrestlers
People from San Francisco
Professional wrestlers from California
20th-century professional wrestlers